The Girl from Montmartre is a 1926 American silent romantic drama film directed by Alfred E. Green and starring Barbara La Marr in her last film role. It was distributed through First National on the day after La Marr died.

Plot
As described in a film magazine review, Emilia Faneaux, the daughter of a derelict Englishman of good family and a Spanish woman, becomes a dance hall performer following the death of her father, while her brother becomes an unscrupulous adventurer. The young woman meets a wealthy Englishman who immediately loves her and whose love she returns. The advent of the Englishman causes the woman’s brother to reform somewhat, and on one occasion he saves the Englishman from death. An actor who wishes to marry the Emilia abducts her. The Englishman pursues him and, after a struggle, rescues the young woman. They go to England and are married.

Cast

Production
In late 1925 during filming of The Girl from Montmartre, as a result of her health issues La Marr collapsed on the film set and later went into a coma. The studio completed the film without her, and it was released the next year on January 31, 1926, which was one day after she died. Two weeks later, First National decided to remove her name from the title card of the film and its advertising, so that the film was promoted as "First National presents The Girl from Montmartre with Lewis Stone."

Preservation
Lost Film Files has mistakenly listed The Girl from Montmartre as a lost film. The online Library of Congress / FIAF database lists a print of the film located in the George Eastman House Motion Picture Collection and an excerpt consisting of one reel at UCLA Film and Television Archive.

References

External links

 

Lobby poster

1926 films
1920s color films
First National Pictures films
American romantic drama films
American silent feature films
American black-and-white films
1926 romantic drama films
Films directed by Alfred E. Green
1920s American films
Silent romantic drama films
Silent American drama films